The Dhaleshwari River ( Dhôleshshori) is a distributary,  long, of the Jamuna River in central Bangladesh. It starts off the Jamuna near the northwestern tip of Tangail District. After that it divides into two branches: the north branch retains the name Dhaleshwari and merges with the other branch, the Kaliganga River at the southern part of Manikganj District. Finally the merged flow meets the Shitalakshya River near Narayanganj District. This combined flow goes southwards to merge into the Meghna River.

See also
 Rivers of Bangladesh

References

Rivers of Bangladesh
Rivers of Dhaka Division